Marcus De Lafaytte Cutler (January 14, 1875 – August 16, 1949) was an American college football coach. He served as the head football coach at Michigan State Normal School—now known as Eastern Michigan University—for one season, in 1895, and compiling a record of 3–3.

Early years
Cutler was born in 1875.  His father, Elim Cutler, was a farmer in DeWitt, Michigan.  At the time of the 1880 U.S. Census, Cutler was living with his parents, Elim and Martha Cutler, and an older brother, David, and older sister, Lillian.

Coaching career
Bennett was the fifth head football coach at Michigan State Normal School—now known as Eastern Michigan University—in Ypsilanti, Michigan, serving for one season, in 1895, and compiling a record of 3–3.

Later years
At the time of the 1900 U.S. Census, Cutler was living in Portland, Michigan working as a school teacher.

At the time of the 1910 U.S. Census, Cutler was living in Lansing, Michigan with his wife, Maud, and two sons, Donovan and M. Vernon.  His occupation was listed as mail carrier for the post office.

In 1920, Cutler was living in Riley Township, Clinton County, Michigan, with his wife, Maud, and three sons, Donovan, Vernon and Neil.  His occupation was listed as a farmer engaged in general farming.  At the time of the 1930 U.S. Census, Cutler remained in Riley Township with his wife, Maud, as a farmer.

Head coaching record

References

1875 births
1949 deaths
Eastern Michigan Eagles football coaches
People from DeWitt, Michigan
People from Portland, Michigan
People from Lansing, Michigan
People from Clinton County, Michigan